Finder of Lost Loves is a studio album by American singer Dionne Warwick. It was released by Arista Records on January 24, 1985 in the United States. Warwick worked with Richard Landis, Barry Manilow, and Stevie Wonder on the majority of the album, though she also reunited with Burt Bacharach for the first time in over a decade. The album includes a cover of the Bee Gees song "Run to Me" performed as a duet with Manilow as well as two duets with Wonder, which had previously been released on Wonder's soundtrack album to The Woman in Red. Finder of Lost Loves peaked at number 106 on the US Billboard 200 chart.

Track listing

Personnel and credits 
Musicians

 Dionne Warwick – lead vocals, backing vocals (7)
 Artie Butler – acoustic piano (1), orchestrations (1, 3, 5, 10), arrangements (1, 3, 5, 10)
 Barry Manilow – arrangements (1, 3, 5, 10), acoustic piano (3, 8, 10), lead and backing vocals (3), rhythm track arrangements (7), synthesizers (8)
 Greg Phillinganes – Fender Rhodes (1, 3, 5, 7, 8, 10), acoustic piano (4)
 Robbie Buchanan – Fender Rhodes (2), synthesizers (4)
 John Philip Shenale – synthesizer programming (2)
 Stevie Wonder – acoustic piano (6, 9), synthesizers (6, 9), Kurzweil 250 (6), harmonica (6), lead vocals (6, 9)
 Keith Harris – synthesizer programming (4, 9)
 Abdoulaye Soumare – additional programming (4, 9)
 Randy Kerber – synthesizers (7)
 Gary Pickus – synthesizers (7), rhythm track arrangements (7)
 Isaiah Sanders – synthesizers (9)
 Charles Fearing – guitar (1, 3, 5, 7, 8, 10)
 Paul Jackson Jr. – guitar (2)
 Dean Parks – guitar (4)
 Tim May – guitar (7)
 Neil Stubenhaus – bass (1, 2, 4, 7)
 Nathan East – bass (3, 5, 8, 10)
 Nathan Watts – bass (6, 9)
 Ed Greene – drums (1, 3, 5, 7, 8, 10)
 John Robinson – drums (2)
 Carlos Vega – drums (4)
 James Allen – drums (6, 9)
 Alan Estes – percussion (1, 3, 5, 7, 8, 10)
 Bob Malach – saxophone (9)
 Charles Calello – arrangements (2)
 Endre Granat – concertmaster (4)
 Jeremy Lubbock – string arrangements (6)
 Greg Poree – string arrangements (9)
 Tommy Funderburk – backing vocals (1, 3, 5, 7, 8, 10)
 Tom Kelly – backing vocals (1, 3, 5, 7, 8, 10)
 Richard Page – backing vocals (1, 2, 3, 5, 7, 8, 10)
 Jim Haas – backing vocals (2)
 John Joyce – backing vocals (2)
 Glenn Jones – lead vocals (4)
 Windy Barnes – backing vocals (9)
 Alex Brown – backing vocals (9)
 Lynn Davis – backing vocals (9)
 Susaye Greene – backing vocals (9)

Production

 Producers – Barry Manilow (Tracks 1, 3, 5, 7, 8 & 10); Richard Landis (Track 2); Burt Bacharach and Carole Bayer Sager (Track 4); Stevie Wonder (Tracks 6 & 9).
 Associate Producer on Tracks 1, 3, 5, 7, 8 & 10 – Michael DeLugg
 Production Coordinator on Track 2 – Kathy Anaya
 Music Coordinator on Track 4 – Frank DeCaro
 Engineers – Michael DeLugg (Tracks 1, 3, 5, 7, 8 & 10); David Cole (Track 2); John Guess (Track 4); Gary Olazabal (Tracks 6 & 9).
 Assistant Engineers – Bill Jackson and Tom Nist (Tracks 1, 3, 5, 7, 8 & 10); Steve Schmitt (Track 4); Bob Harlan (Tracks 6 & 9).
 Recorded at Sunset Sound and Capitol Studios (Hollywood, California); Lion Share Recording Studio (Los Angeles, California).
 Mixed at The Village Recorder (Los Angeles, California).
 Project Coordinator – Eric Borenstein
 Art Direction – Donn Davenport 
 Photography – Harry Langdon 
 Assistant to Barry Manilow – Marc Hulett

Charts

References

External links
Finder of Lost Loves at Discogs

Dionne Warwick albums
1985 albums
albums arranged by Charles Calello
Albums produced by Richard Landis
Albums produced by Burt Bacharach
Albums produced by Stevie Wonder
Arista Records albums